The water skiing competition at the 2018 Mediterranean Games in Tarragona took place on 23 and 24 June at Marina Port Tarraco.

Medal summary

Events

Medal table

References

External links
 Waterski results at Tarragona 2018

Waterskiing
2018
Med